Iranildo Hermínio Ferreira (born 16 October 1976) is a Brazilian former footballer who played as a midfielder for several Brazilian Série A clubs.

Career
Born in Igarassu, he started his professional career in 1994, with Madureira. With Botafogo, he won the Série A in 1995. Iranildo was part of the Flamengo squads that won the Campeonato Carioca in 1996, 1999 and 2000, and the Copa Mercosur in 1999, among other titles. He helped Brasiliense win the Campeonato Brasiliense in 2004, 2005 and in 2006, and the Série B in 2004.

Honours

Club
Botafogo
Série A: 1995

Brasiliense
Série B: 2004
Campeonato Brasiliense: 2004, 2005, 2006, 2007, 2008 and 2009

Flamengo
Campeonato Carioca: 1996, 1999, 2000
Copa dos Campeões Mundiais: 1997
Copa Mercosur: 1999
Taça Guanabara: 1999
Taça Rio: 1996, 2000

References

1976 births
Living people
Brazilian footballers
Association football midfielders
Brazilian expatriate footballers
Expatriate footballers in Greece
Expatriate footballers in Saudi Arabia
Brazilian expatriate sportspeople in Saudi Arabia
Campeonato Brasileiro Série A players
Campeonato Brasileiro Série B players
Saudi Professional League players
Madureira Esporte Clube players
Botafogo de Futebol e Regatas players
CR Flamengo footballers
Esporte Clube Bahia players
Associação Desportiva São Caetano players
Aris Thessaloniki F.C. players
Santa Cruz Futebol Clube players
Brasiliense Futebol Clube players
Esporte Clube Rio Verde players
Al-Hazem F.C. players
Ceilândia Esporte Clube players
Palmas Futebol e Regatas players
1996 CONCACAF Gold Cup players